= Moosburger Mitterteich =

- Location within Austria
- Location: Carinthia, Austria
- Coordinates: 46°39′33″N 14°09′44″E
- Type: lake

Moosburger Mitterteich is a lake of Carinthia, Austria.
